Remember to Live (Spanish: Acuérdate de vivir) is a 1953 Mexican drama film directed by Roberto Gavaldón and starring Libertad Lamarque, Carmen Montejo and Miguel Torruco.

Main cast
 Libertad Lamarque as Yolanda  
 Carmen Montejo as Leonora  
 Miguel Torruco as Manuel Iturbide  
 Joaquín Cordero as Jorge, adulto  
 Elda Peralta as Marta  
 Yolanda Varela as Silvia  
 Luis Rodríguez as Andrés  
 Tito Novaro as José Eduardo Pacheco  
 Dolores Camarillo as Margarita  
 Juan Orraca Jr. as Andrés, niño  
 Nicolás Rodríguez Jr. as Jorge, niño  
 Bárbara Gil as Esther  
 Tito Junco as Ingeniero Raúl Fuentes

References

Bibliography 
 Darlene J. Sadlier. Latin American Melodrama: Passion, Pathos, and Entertainment. University of Illinois Press, 2009.

External links 
 

1953 films
1953 drama films
Mexican drama films
1950s Spanish-language films
Films directed by Roberto Gavaldón
Mexican black-and-white films
1950s Mexican films